Sui (Balochi: سوئ), is a sub-district of Dera Bugti District in Balochistan, Pakistan. The Sui gas field is located near Sui town. Generally this is the area of Bugti's.

Location
The town of Sui is near the corner where the provinces of Baluchistan, Sindh and Punjab meet. It is about 9 km from Punjab, and 10 km from Sindh. The Indus River flows 25 km to the east of it. It is 40 km south of Dera Bugti. Sui has gas compression facilities from where natural gas is pipelined to nearby towns in Punjab and Sindh. It is also pipelined to Quetta, the largest city in Balochistan, about 200 miles away.

Administration
The town of Sui serves as the administrative centre of Sui tehsil, a subdivision of the district, the town of Sui itself functions as a Union Council.
It is at the corner where the province of Sindh and Punjab meet. About 6 miles from Punjab, 7 miles from Sindh. The Indus River flows 20 miles to the east of it.

References

Populated places in Dera Bugti District
Union councils of Balochistan, Pakistan